Maher Ismael Othman ((born 8 January 1991) is a Saudi football player who plays as a midfielder .

Honours
Al-Batin
MS League: 2019–20

References

External links
 

1991 births
Living people
Al-Ahli Saudi FC players
Al-Wehda Club (Mecca) players
Al-Tai FC players
Al Batin FC players
Saudi Arabian footballers
Sportspeople from Mecca
Saudi First Division League players
Saudi Professional League players
Association football midfielders